Pridnestrovian Moldavian Republic (Transnistria) official statistics show that 91 percent of the Transnistrian population adhere to Eastern Orthodox Christianity, with 4 percent adhering to the Catholic Church. Roman Catholics are mainly located in Northern Transnistria, where a notable Polish minority is living.

Transnistria's government has supported the restoration and construction of new Orthodox churches. It affirms that the republic has freedom of religion and states that 114 religious beliefs and congregations are officially registered. However, as recently as 2009, registration hurdles were met with by some religious groups, notably the Jehovah's Witnesses.

References

 
Demographics of Transnistria
History of Eastern Europe
History of Transnistria
Transnistrian culture